Hosťovce may refer to several places in Slovakia.

Hosťovce, Košice-okolie District
Hosťovce, Zlaté Moravce District